Djebel Bent Ahmed is a natural site located in the Jendouba, Tunisia which covers an area of 1,541 hectares. It was classified as a nature reserve in 2009.

References

Environment of Tunisia